Doug Ghim (born April 16, 1996) is an American professional golfer who grew up in Arlington Heights, Illinois and graduated from Buffalo Grove High School. In May 2018, Ghim became the top-ranked golfer in the World Amateur Golf Ranking.

Amateur career
Ghim competed at the 2016 Arnold Palmer Cup.

Ghim was runner-up at the 2017 U.S. Amateur to earn invitations to the 2018 Masters Tournament and U.S. Open. He also won the 2017 Pacific Coast Amateur. From a team perspective, Ghim competed at the 2017 Arnold Palmer Cup and 2017 Walker Cup.

At the 2018 Masters, Ghim scored multiple eagles to earn an award of two pairs of crystal goblets. As the only amateur to make the cut, he earned low amateur honors. He finished tied for 50th at 296 (+8).

Ghim won the 2018 Ben Hogan Award as the best male college golfer. Prior to the 2018 Travelers Championship, Ghim turned professional.

Amateur wins
2010 Junior All-Star At The Rail
2011 Illinois State Junior Amateur, Coca-Cola Junior, McArthur Towel & Sports Future Legends
2014 CB&I Championship at Carlton Woods
2017 UT Longhorn Shootout, Pacific Coast Amateur, Golf Club of Georgia Collegiate, Andeavor Sun Bowl Classic
2018 Big 12 Championship, NCAA Raleigh Regional

Sources:

Results in major championships

LA = Low amateur
CUT = missed the halfway cut 
"T" = tied

Results in The Players Championship

CUT = missed the halfway cut
"T" indicates a tie for a place

U.S. national team appearances
Amateur
Arnold Palmer Cup: 2016, 2017 (winners)
Walker Cup: 2017 (winners)

See also
2019 Korn Ferry Tour Finals graduates

References

American male golfers
Texas Longhorns men's golfers
PGA Tour golfers
Korn Ferry Tour graduates
Golfers from Illinois
People from Des Plaines, Illinois
People from Arlington Heights, Illinois
1996 births
Living people